Shirley Gill (born 19 November 1918, date of death unknown) was a Barbadian cricketer. He played in one first-class match for the Barbados cricket team in 1940/41.

See also
 List of Barbadian representative cricketers

References

External links
 

1918 births
Year of death missing
Barbadian cricketers
Barbados cricketers
People from Saint Michael, Barbados